Leptothorax minutissimus is a species of ant in the genus Leptothorax. It is native to the United States.

References

minutissimus
Hymenoptera of North America
Insects of the United States
Insects described in 1942
Taxonomy articles created by Polbot